Moothon, also known internationally as The Elder One, is a 2019 Indian Malayalam-language drama film written and directed by Geetu Mohandas, and jointly produced by S. Vinod Kumar, Anurag Kashyap, Ajay G. Rai and Alan McAlex. Featuring a bilingual narrative in Jeseri dialect of Malayalam and Hindi, the film stars Nivin Pauly, Shashank Arora, Sobhita Dhulipala, Melissa Raju Thomas, Sanjana Dipu and Roshan Mathew. Hindi-language dialogues were written by Anurag Kashyap. The film premiered at the 2019 Toronto International Film Festival and received a positive critical response. It was included in The Hindu's top 25 Malayalam films of the decade and is widely regarded as one of the defining movies of the New Wave Movement.

Plot
The story is about a 14-year-old child, Mulla from Lakshadweep who travels to Mumbai in search of Moothon (elder brother), Akbar, who left the island for Mumbai many years ago. Mulla is a child living in Lakshadweep islands under the care of Moosa, a fisherman. He is seen to be wearing baggy clothes and doesn't go to school due to bullying. The bullies make him wear lipstick and a veil, and he hates feminine clothes. He laments his brother, who disappeared from the island, and tries to search for him. Moosa tells him to drop the issue and to stop imitating his brother's mannerisms and tells that Mulla can't become like Moothon by wearing his clothes.

He suspects that Moothon left due to an affair with Aamina and tries to get her number. Moosa responds that the only Aamina he knows is a fish. However, he manages to get her number. One day, while getting bullied, his friends help him strike back. However, Mulla gets slapped by Moosa for this, and he leaves the island by taking a boat under the cover of darkness and proceeds to get hit by a large wave in the ocean, capsizing the boat. He hallucinates a mermaid rescuing him, but in fact, he gets rescued by a ship.

The ship authorities send him to a police station, and there is a communication barrier as he doesn't know Hindi. From there, he is sent to a govt-funded orphanage. He is hesitant in taking a bath together with the boys, and from there, he befriends Raju. The warden tries to molest him, but he manages to escape from him due to Raju's intervention. Raju tells about his mother Rosi and where he could find her. Mulla escapes from there in search of Raju's mother. Mulla finds Raju's mother to be a prostitute, who helps him. She provides him shelter and introduces him to a tea seller, who gives him a livelihood selling tea. The neighborhood boys bully him and steal his money, which he had been saving for calling Aamina.

While resting on the street after work, he gets kidnapped by Bhai, a local goon involved in child trafficking and drug dealing. He tries to escape, but is caught by the street boys working for bhai. Bhai plans on selling him, and Bhai's sidekick Salim sets up a deal. Bhai himself is from the islands and understands his language. Bhai orders him to deliver a package. However, on seeing a cop, he flees, dropping the package. However, smartphones drop out of the package. Mulla comes back to Bhai's haunt and tries to steal cash to take his phone. Seeing this, Bhai is enraged and slaps him. He reveals that he was trying to find his moothon Akbar and that he is, in fact his sister, Mulla. Bhai is shocked on hearing the revelation, and understands that Mulla is, in fact his sister, although Bhai does not reveal this to Mulla. Bhai warns Mulla to stay inside until he comes back. One of the boys from the street enters the house looking for Mulla while she was bathing and finds out that Mulla is, in fact, a girl.

In the flashback, Bhai lives in his islands as Akbar. He lives in Lakshwadweep and is a performer of the Muslim ritual Kuthu Ratheeb, along with Moosa. They are professional ritual dancers. During a performance, he makes eye contact with a young man named Ameer, who had just returned from Bombay. Ameer is Aamina's brother. Aamina is close with Akbar's family. Ameer is a mute, and he had learnt sign language from Bombay, though only Akbar happens to understand it at least partly. Ameer is romantically interested in Akbar, however, Akbar is at first ambivalent about expressing his feelings. Ameer invites Akbar to his home when Aamina and her mother are away. Akbar goes to Ameer that night. Their relationship upsets Akbar's family, Moosa beats and warns Ameer to stay away from Akbar. Ameer gets engaged, but he wants to leave the island with Akbar and settle in Mumbai. But Akbar initially disapproves of the plan leaving Ameer, who commits suicide.

At present, Akbar, knowing that his boss is looking for her, approaches Aamina, who now works as cabaret dancer in Mumbai. Akbar asks her to take care of Mulla, but she refuses. So he leaves Mulla to his transgender friend Lateef. The don threatens to kill Akbar and his assistant Salim, if he did not receive the money lost for the dropped package. But Akbar claims a bigger assignment to pay the debt. He is assigned with 20 other thugs to transfer a huge amount of money to a middleman, but fails to do so as he is ambushed by another gang in a car chase, due to backstabbing by a gang member. Mulla runs away from Lateef, who tells her to dress as a girl, and goes back to Bhai's shelter only to realise that Bhai has been caught by the police.

Salim uses this opportunity to sell the girl. Lateef gets Akbar out of jail, and upon release, he beats up Salim asking Mulla's whereabouts. Salim takes Akbar to the place where he sold the girl, and Akbar is shocked on seeing something and gets shot at the same instance. Later the boy from the street who woos Mulla knocks on the door of a brothel, and Mulla opens the door with long hair and girly clothes and a smile.

Cast

Nivin Pauly as Akbar/Bhai
Sanjana Dipu as Mulla, Akbar's sibling 
Shashank Arora as Salim
Sobhita Dhulipala as Rosy
Dileesh Pothan as Moosa
Roshan Mathew as Ameer, Akbar's love interest
Anjaly Devi as Ameer's wife
Harish Khanna as Karim
Sujith Shankar as Latheef
Melissa Raju Thomas as Amina
Vipin Sharma as Warden
 Ajay Indrajeet Yadav as Pikku
 Mini as Akbar’s mother

Production
The screenplay was written by Geetu Mohandas originally under the title Insha' Allah: In Pursuit of Akbar. The story was about a teenager who is in search of his elder brother Akbar. For the script, Geetu won the Global Filmmaking Award at the 2016 Sundance Film Festival, along with four other filmmakers. In January 2016, she announced that it would be made into a feature film in Malayalam and Hindi languages, and filming would commence post monsoon that year.

In January 2017, the cast and crew were revealed along with a poster. The title was changed to Moothon (meaning: elder brother, in Malayalam). Produced jointly by Aanand L. Rai for Colour Yellow Productions and Ajay G. Rai and Alan McAlex for JAR Pictures, the film will be distributed by Eros International. Anurag Kashyap wrote the Hindi dialogues. Nivin Pauly plays the leading role along with Shashank Arora as the negative lead. Geetu has mentioned in her interviews that Nivin was not the first person to come to her mind to play the protagonist, after completing the screenplay. She toggled with many names, and eventually, the role fell into Nivin's lap. Geetu has reiterated that in this movie, she was not looking for actors but wanted to cast the person in the actor. Her husband Rajeev Ravi handles the cinematography. The film marks Geetu's feature directorial debut in Malayalam. Geetu call the film an "adventure drama", even though she does not believe in confining it into a clear-cut genre, saying "it can always turn into something else".

Filming in Mumbai was concluded by second week of May 2017. Filming resumed in Lakshadweep in May 2018. It was completed on 14 May 2018.

Release
The film premiered at the Toronto International Film Festival in September 2019, with the cast and crew in attendance. It was screened at the Mumbai Film Festival on October 18, 2019. Pauly has stated during an interview that the filmmakers planned for Moothon released theatrically on 8 November 2019. The film dubbed in Telugu with same title and released on Aha

Critical reception
Moothon generally received positive reviews from the critics. Sify rated the movie 4 on 5 stars and said,"Moothon treads on an unconventional terrain for Malayalam and opens a fascinating world for the viewer. Don’t miss this one!" The News Minute rated the movie 4 on 5 stars and said, "Geetu Mohandas-Nivin Pauly deliver a brilliant film" The Times of India rated the movie 4 on 5 stars and said, "Moothon is what happens when a powerful story meets a competent director who ropes in some of the best artists and technicians, knowing exactly what to get from them, and how. Moothon is a brave film."

The New Indian Express reviewed, "A welcome change for Malayalam film industry overdosed by feel-good films" The Indian Express rated the movie 3 on 5 stars and said, "Nivin Pauly delivers in this dark existential drama." Behindwood rated the movie 3.25 stars on 5 and reviewed, "Moothon is packed with top-notch performances. Nivin Pauly beautifully straddles the contrasting sides of Akbar's character while Roshan Matthew memorably plays the sensitivity of Aamir. Shashank Arora deserves a special mention as Sameer. Moothon is a visceral, grim yet optimistic exploration of human nature."

Dennis Harvey from Variety wrote that "The film benefits from strong performances, particularly by the male leads in the flashback. It also sports flavorful cinematography (Rajeev Ravi) and production design (Abid T.P.). But a story with this much woe on its plate needs to slow down more often to let us fully absorb the cruel turns of fate, and “The Elder One” is often in a confounding rush". The Hindu wrote about the movie as, "Although it does not play out smoothly all through, Moothon has enough depth in it for us to dive deep, and come back with material to ponder. Geetu Mohandas makes a brave statement with her first film in Malayalam." HuffPost wrote, "Nivin Pauly Is Spot On, But Let Down By Inconsistent Writing." Baradwaj Rangan of Film Companion South wrote "One part of me wished this ambitious film had stuck to one story in one timeline, but in a strange way, this in-between mood is what makes the events stand out".

Awards and nominations

References

External links
 

2019 films
2010s Malayalam-language films
2019 action thriller films
Indian action thriller films
2010s Hindi-language films
Indian multilingual films
2019 multilingual films
Films set in Mumbai
Films shot in Mumbai